Pruett is most commonly a surname in American vernacular.

History
Pruett as an American surname can be traced back through Southern family genealogy in the late 1600s back to origins in France.

People
Notable individuals include: 
 Allan K. Pruett (1948–2008), American basketball player
 Robert Lewis "Bob" Pruett (born 1943), American college football coach
 Hubert Shelby "Hub" "Shucks" Pruett (1900–1982), American professional baseball player
 Norma Jean "Jeanne" Bowman, Mrs. Jack Pruett (born 1937), American country music singer
 Kyle D. Pruett (contemporary), American professor of child psychiatry, author, and television host
 Marion Albert Pruett (1950–1999), American serial killer
 Millus and Myles Pruett (or Pruitt), American blues musicians in the 1920s
 R. C. Pruett (born 1944), American politician from Oklahoma; representative in the state legislature since 2004
 Scott Donald Pruett (born 1960), American race car driver

Surnames from nicknames